Many nations have implemented, are implementing, or have proposed nationwide digital identity systems.

Although many facets of digital identity are universal owing in part to the ubiquity of the Internet, some regional variations exist due to specific laws, practices and government services that are in place. For example, digital identy can use services that validate driving licences, passports and other physical documents online to help improve the quality of a digital identity. Also, strict policies against money laundering mean that some services, such as money transfers need a stricter level of validation of digital identity.

Digital identity in the national sense can mean a combination of single sign on, and/or validation of assertions by trusted authorities (generally the government).

General characteristics 
Potential benefits of a national digital identity system include:

 More convenience
 Less costs
 Greater access to services
 More privacy and security

However, a national digital identity system reduces anonymity and puts people at risk of data breaches. They may also be prone to human rights abuses.

Asia

China 
China's Resident Identity Card cross references to other services (banking, Internet service providers, etc.) and thus acts as a digital identity system.

India 

In India, the Aadhaar card is used as a digital ID service, mainly for government institutions.

Iran 

The Iranian identity card is ubiquitous.

Singapore 
Singapore's SingPass is being extended to National Digital Identity for government services, though the intent is to extend it to private institutions. The corporate login version is called CorpPass.

Europe

European Union 
On June 3, 2021, the European Commission proposed a framework for a European Digital Identity. It is planned to be available to citizens, residents, and business within the EU. Though it should be suitable for online and offline private and public services, it can be used by participants for personal identification or to provide confirmation about specific personal information. Benefits included are the EU wide recognition of every digital identity card, a secure way on how to control the amount of data and information the user wants to share with the services as well as the simple operation via digital wallets using several mobile devices.

Estonia 

The Estonian identity card can be used by governments and some third parties for authentication.

Germany 
There is an online ID card available in Germany. The user can identify himself securely on the internet, at vending machines or several citizen terminals. Thereby business and authority matters can be easily worked out electronically to save time, cost and money. In the framework of a competition called "Schaufenster Sichere Digitale Identitäten", the German Federal Ministry of economy and energy created a project, called "IDunion". This project was launched on April 1, 2021, and aims to create the opportunity for inhabitants to get easier access to education, mobility, e-government, industry, health care and much more.

Italy 
The Sistema Pubblico di Identità Digitale (SPID) can be used as a digital ID for public and private institutions.

Monaco 
Since June 2021, Monaco citizens and residents can get digital IDs for public institutions and for access to telecom or electricity services.

Ukraine 

Ukraine introduced online ID cards in April 2020, and fully legalized the use of online ID documents on August 23, 2021. Ukrainian citizens can use an app called "Diia" for identification purposes. Every user will be able to choose whether to use the paper documents or digital ones as for authorities will not be able to demand paper documents from citizens if they have digital ones. Digital identity can be used not only for provision of public and government services but also to receive deliveries, confirm age in supermarkets and open new bank accounts.

United Kingdom 

The United Kingdom's system GOV.UK Verify went live on 24 May 2016. In 2022, the UK government announced that GOV.UK Verify would be closing down, becoming unusable by April 2023. 

The system provides a single login for digital government services which verifies the user's identity in 15 minutes. It allowed users to choose one of several identity verification services, and provided access to 22 digital government services.

Australia 

In Australia, MyGov/MyGovID and Australia Post DigitaliD provide a means of single sign on. MyGov only supports government agencies, whereas Australia Post's DigitaliD solution supports private institutions.

Caribbean 

In the Caribbean represent particular challenges due to the region's geographies, political context, social inequalities and cultural diversity. In the case of Jamaica and the Dominican Republic, Digital ID national systems have been particularly illustrious of pressing issues such as the reinforcement of discriminatory biases and severe limitations to the right to privacy. Regardless of claims over these issues by civil society organisations and social movements, policies have progressed in both countries.

Jamaica

Dominican Republic

United States 
Although no ubiquitous digital identity service exists, U.S. Social Security numbers act as a national identity number and can be validated by authorized private institutions using the American government's Social Security Number Validation Service.

References

Bibliography

Further reading

External links 

 National IDs Around the World — Interactive map

E-government
Public services
Identity management systems